Bradley Lake is located in Grand Teton National Park, in the U. S. state of Wyoming. The glacially formed lake is located near the terminus of Garnet Canyon. Bradley Lake can be accessed by the Bradley Lake Trail, a  roundtrip hike commencing from the Taggart Lake trailhead parking area.

See also
Geology of the Grand Teton area

References

Lakes of Grand Teton National Park